WYUM (101.7 FM) is a radio station broadcasting a country music format.  Licensed to Mount Vernon, Georgia, United States.  The station is currently owned by Dennis Jones, through licensee RadioJones, LLC, and features programming from ABC Radio and Jones Radio Network.

References

External links

YUM
Radio stations established in 1950